The Wandering Beast (French:La bête errante) is a 1932 French drama film directed by Marco de Gastyne and starring Gabriel Gabrio, Maurice Maillot and Os-Ko-Mon. The film is set in Alaska.

Cast
  Gabriel Gabrio  as Gregory  
 Maurice Maillot as Hurricane  
 Os-Ko-Mon as Villi Kins  
 Choura Milena  as Flossie  
 Jacqueline Torrent as Daisy 
 Emile Denois
 Andrews Engelmann 
 Alberte Gallé 
 Teddy Michaud
 Germaine Michel

References

Bibliography 
 Philippe Rège. Encyclopedia of French Film Directors, Volume 1. Scarecrow Press, 2009.

External links 
 

1932 films
1930s French-language films
Films directed by Marco de Gastyne
Films set in Alaska
Pathé films
French drama films
British black-and-white films
1932 drama films
1930s French films